WCFA-LP (101.5 FM) is a non-commercial low-power FM community radio station in Cape May, New Jersey, United States. The station is licensed to the Center For Community Arts, Inc., nonprofit organization that sponsors multicultural arts, humanities and history programs for young people and adults. It has been broadcasting 24 hours a day, seven days a week with an all-volunteer staff since first going on the air on November 28, 2006.

WCFA, which has its antenna located on the water tower in nearby Wildwood Crest, covers a 10-mile radius on the southern tip of New Jersey. The station's primary service area includes Cape May, West Cape May, The Wildwoods and Villas, but it can be heard as far north as Avalon on Seven Mile Island.

The station has a Variety music format. It also carries local public affairs programs, as well as shows on gardening and cooking.

See also
List of community radio stations in the United States

References

External links
 
 

CFA-LP
Radio stations established in 2006
Cape May, New Jersey
Community radio stations in the United States